The Tana River Primate National Reserve is a former  national wildlife reserve in south-eastern Kenya.  It existed from 1976 to 2007.

Geography

History
The government of Kenya set aside the land in 1976 as an order to protect the swampy forests of the Lower Tana River and two endangered primates, the Tana River mangabey and the Tana River red colobus, that are found there. The endangered primates inhabit sixteen patches of forest (ranging from .1 to 6.25 km2) which extends for 60 km down the meandering lower Tana River, between Nkanjonja and Mitapani.

Despite a $6.7 million World Bank Global Environment Facility project (1996 to 2001), conservation measures for the two primates have been largely ineffective.

In 2005, more than 250 families of farmers were relocated 90 km away to the coastal community of Kipini.

De-protection
In 2007, the High Court of Kenya ruled that the reserve had not been properly established according to Kenyan law. As a result, the reserve was degazetted−disestablished, removing all official protection of the area and its National Reserve status and funding.

Habitat 
The lush river forest patches are remainders of western African forests. The river cuts through dry woodland and open savannah. Recorded bird species there number 262, and at least 57 species of mammals live there. There are several endemic tree species as well as a variety of other animals and plants.  Many of the bird and animal species in the reserve are unusual in East Africa, being typical of Central Africa’s lowland rainforest. The white-winged apalis is extremely rare. The African openbill stork, martial eagle, bat hawk, African pygmy-falcon, African barred owlet, scaly babbler, black-bellied glossy-starling, and  golden pipit are also rare. Recent research has shown that, if restored, this area could act as a refugium for wildlife with moderate levels of climate change.

See also

References

External links 
  Naturekenya.org: Diversity and Biogeograph of Herpetofauna of the Tana River Primate Nation Reserve, Kenya
 doi.org: "Primate Conservation along the Tana River, Kenya: An Examination of the Forest Habitat"

Former protected areas
Wildlife sanctuaries of Kenya
Primate sanctuaries
Tana River (Kenya)
Tana River County
Government agencies disestablished in 2007
Protected areas established in 1976
Protected areas disestablished in 2007
1976 establishments in Kenya
2007 disestablishments in Kenya
Environmental issues in Kenya
National parks of Kenya
Northern Zanzibar–Inhambane coastal forest mosaic